Eiffelia is an extinct genus of sponges known from the Middle Cambrian Burgess Shale as well as several Early Cambrian small shelly fossil deposits. It is named after Eiffel Peak, which was itself named after the Eiffel Tower. It was first described in 1920 by Charles Doolittle Walcott. It belongs in the Hexactinellid stem group. 60 specimens of Eiffelia are known from the Greater Phyllopod bed, where they comprise 0.11% of the community.

Eiffelia generally have star-shaped six-rayed spicules, with rays diverging at 60°, occasionally with a seventh ray perpendicular to the other six.

Species
Two species are known:

 †Eiffelia globosa Walcott, 1920: This species is known from the Middle Cambrian Burgess Shale. In life, it had a globe-like shape and was up to 6 cm in diameter.
 †Eiffelia araniformis (Missarzhevsky in Missarzhevsky & Mambetov, 1981): This species is known from several Early Cambrian small shelly fossil deposits in the Siberian Platform, Mongolia, China, Europe, and Australia. It was originally described in the genus Lenastella. It was moved to Eiffelia by Bengtson et al. (1990).
Synonyms:

Lenastella araniformis Missarzhevsky in Missarzhevsky & Mambetov, 1981
 Lenastella aculeata Missarzhevsky in Missarzhevsky & Mambetov, 1981
 Lenastella mucronata Missarzhevsky in Missarzhevsky & Mambetov, 1981
 Lenastella umbonata Missarzhevsky in Missarzhevsky & Mambetov, 1981
 Actinoites universalis Duan, 1984
 Actinoites simplex Duan, 1984
 Niphadus xihaopingensis Duan, 1984
 Niphadus complanatus Duan, 1984

References

External links
 

Burgess Shale fossils
Hexactinellida genera
Prehistoric sponge genera
Burgess Shale sponges
Taxa named by Charles Doolittle Walcott
Fossil taxa described in 1920

Cambrian genus extinctions